Colin Chisholm (born February 25, 1963) is a Canadian former professional ice hockey defenceman.  He was drafted in the third round, 60th overall, by the Buffalo Sabres in the 1981 NHL Entry Draft. He played one game in the National Hockey League with the Minnesota North Stars in the 1986–87 season, going scoreless. However he was unable to continue playing hockey due to a medical condition.

Career statistics

Regular season and playoffs

See also
 List of players who played only one game in the NHL

External links
 

1963 births
Living people
Alberta Golden Bears ice hockey players
Buffalo Sabres draft picks
Calgary Wranglers (WHL) players
Canadian ice hockey defencemen
Kalamazoo Wings (1974–2000) players
Minnesota North Stars players
Ice hockey people from Edmonton
Springfield Indians players